Tullibardine railway station  served the town of Tullibardine, Perth and Kinross in Scotland.

History
It was built in 1857 for the Crieff Junction Railway, which connected the town of Crieff , six miles to the north, with the Scottish Central Railway at Crieff Junction (now Gleneagles).  The CJR was absorbed by the Caledonian Railway in 1865, which itself became part of the London, Midland and Scottish in 1923. The line and the station were closed as part of the Beeching closures in 1964.

References

Disused railway stations in Perth and Kinross
Beeching closures in Scotland
Former Caledonian Railway stations
Railway stations in Great Britain opened in 1857
Railway stations in Great Britain closed in 1964